The 2020 Rhode Island Rams football team represented the University of Rhode Island in the 2020–21 NCAA Division I FCS football season. They were led by seventh-year head coach Jim Fleming and played their home games at Meade Stadium. They competed as a member of the Colonial Athletic Association.

On July 17, 2020, the Colonial Athletic Association announced that it would not play fall sports due to the COVID-19 pandemic. However, the conference is allowing the option for teams to play as independents for the 2020 season if they still wish to play in the fall.

On April 7, 2021, the team announced that its season would end earlier than expected due to a mandated pause in team activities resulting from positive COVID-19 cases that extended past their last scheduled game.

Previous season

The Rams finished the 2019 season 2–10, 0–8 in CAA play to finish in last place.

Schedule
Rhode Island had a game scheduled against Brown on October 3, which was later canceled before the start of the 2020 season. The CAA released its spring conference schedule on October 27, 2020.

References

Rhode Island
Rhode Island Rams football seasons
Rhode Island Rams football